Talleres is a Spanish word meaning workshops, and may refer to:

Talleres (Monterrey Metro), a metro station in Mexico
Club Atlético Talleres (Córdoba), an Argentine association football club
Club Atlético Talleres de Perico, an Argentine association football club
Club Atlético Talleres de Remedios de Escalada, an Argentine association football club